Cannonball Adderley Live! is a live album by jazz saxophonist Cannonball Adderley recorded at Shelly's Manne-Hole and released on the Capitol label featuring performances by Adderley with Nat Adderley, Charles Lloyd, Joe Zawinul, Sam Jones and Louis Hayes.

Reception
The Allmusic review by Scott Yanow awarded the album 3 (out of 5) stars and states: "When Riverside Records went into bankruptcy, Adderley signed with Capitol, a label whose interest in jazz ... tended to be short-lived. As a result, Cannonball's recordings would become more commercial as the 1960s developed but this early Capitol effort is quite good. Charles Lloyd had just joined Adderley's Sextet and his tenor and flute were major assets".

Track listing 
 "Little Boy With Sad Eyes" (Nat Adderley) - 12:35  
 "Work Song" (Nat Adderley) - 8:30 
 "Sweet Georgia Bright (Charles Lloyd) - 6:25   
 "The Song My Lady Sings" (Charles Lloyd) - 15:05
 "Theme" (Sam Jones) - 1:10  
 Recorded live at Shelly's Manne-Hole, Los Angeles, July 31, August 1 & 2 1964

Personnel 
 Cannonball Adderley - alto saxophone
 Nat Adderley - cornet
 Charles Lloyd - tenor saxophone, flute
 Joe Zawinul - piano
 Sam Jones - bass
 Louis Hayes - drums

References 

1964 live albums
Capitol Records live albums
Cannonball Adderley live albums
Albums produced by David Axelrod (musician)
Albums recorded at Shelly's Manne-Hole